Behind the Times is a 1911 short film by Thomas H. Ince with Owen Moore, Ethel Grandin, and Lucille Young. According to a contemporary newspaper, the story is about the conflict between an old priest who is asked to retire and a young priest who can't do the job properly.

References

1911 films
American silent short films
American black-and-white films
1910s American films